Below are the rosters for the 2009 Toulon Tournament.

Group A

Head coach: Sergio Batista

Head coach: Miroslav Soukup

Head coach: Hans Schrijver

Head coach: Mahdi Ali Hassan Redha
GK Mohammed Saif Youssuf Al Ahli United Arab Emirates
FW Ali Ahmed Al Hajeri Al Jazira United Arab Emirates
DF Saad Surour Baniyas Al Ahli United Arab Emirates
DF Fahad Sebil Ibrahim Obaid Al Nasr United Arab Emirates
MF Adnan Ali Shanbih Al Nasr United Arab Emirates
MF Habib Al Fardan Al Wasl F.C. United Arab Emirates
DF Mohamed Fawzi Abdalla Al Ahli United Arab Emirates
MF Ahmed Ali Khamis Al Arbi Al Wahda United Arab Emirates
FW Theyeb Awana Baniyas Sports United Arab Emirates
FW Salem Saleh Al Rejaibi United Arab Emirates
DF Abdelaziz Mohammed Sanqour Al Ahli United Arab Emirates
FW Mohammed Al Alawi Fayez Al Ain United Arab Emirates
DF Abdulaziz Hussain Al Balooshi Al Shabab United Arab Emirates
GK Yousif Abdelrahman Albairaq Ittihad Kalba United Arab Emirates
FW Ahmed Al Junaibi Khalil Shabbab Al Ahli Club United Arab Emirates
MF Maher Ghuloom Jassim Al Wasl F.C. United Arab Emirates
MF Sultan Saleh Bargash Al Menhali Al Jazira United Arab Emirates
DF Hamdan Ismaeel Al Kamali Al Wahda United Arab Emirates
MF Omar Al-Amoodi Abdulrahman Al Ain United Arab Emirates
DF Mohammed Ahmed Juma Gharib Al Shabab United Arab Emirates

Group B

Head coach: Ivo Basay

Head coach: Erick Mombaerts

Head coach: Rui Caçador

Head coach: Jean-Dominique Paternoga

Footnotes

Squads
Toulon Tournament squads